Taining may refer to:

Places
Taining County, a county in Fujian, China

Historical eras
Taining (太寧, 323–326), era name used by Emperor Ming of Jin
Taining (太寧, 349), era name used by Later Zhao emperors Shi Hu, Shi Shi, Shi Zun and (briefly) Shi Jian
Taining (太寧, 561–562), era name used by Emperor Wucheng of Northern Qi

People
Cheng Taining Chinese architect